Nobecovirus is a subgenus of viruses in the genus Betacoronavirus. The viruses in the group were previously known as group 2d coronaviruses.

Structure
The viruses of this subgenus, like other coronaviruses, have a lipid bilayer envelope in which the membrane (M), envelope (E) and spike (S) structural proteins are anchored.

See also
Embecovirus (group 2a)
Sarbecovirus (group 2b)
Merbecovirus (group 2c)

References

Betacoronaviruses
Virus subgenera